"Diamond Head" was an instrumental by the Ventures in Japan and Hong Kong. It also charted in the United States in both the Billboard and Cashbox charts. It was written by Dan Hamilton.

Background
In addition to being recorded by the Ventures, it has also been covered by Aqua Velvets, and Susan and the Surftones. It was also covered with Japanese lyrics by Joō-sama as an OP for the anime adaptation of Kochira Katsushika-ku Kameari Kōen-mae Hashutsujo.

Charts
For the week ending March 13, 1965, "Diamond Head" had moved up two notches from #4 to #2 in the Hong Kong Top Ten. The following week it had reached #1 there. The song became Japan's first million-seller and sold more than 1,850,000 copies there. It was a hit in Iran and got to #70 in the US.

References

1965 songs
1965 singles
The Ventures songs
Instrumentals
Surf music
Rock instrumentals
1960s instrumentals
Surf instrumentals
Songs written by Dan Hamilton (musician)
Song recordings produced by Dick Glasser